Nicola White,  (born 20 January 1988) is an English international field hockey player who plays as a forward for  England and Great Britain.

She now plays club hockey in the Women's England Hockey League Premier Division for Hampstead & Westminster, joining the club for the 2020-21 season after many successful years playing for Holcombe.

White won a gold medal at the 2016 Olympic Games and a bronze medal at the 2012 Olympic Games

After making her International debut for England in May 2009, White has won silver at the Champions Trophy and bronze medals at the World Cup, Commonwealth, and European competitions.

She was born in Shaw and Crompton, and began playing hockey at the age of 7 at school and started her club hockey at Saddleworth HC and is now currently playing for Holcombe HC in the Premier Division. In addition to her sporting accolades, she completed her Sports Science Degree at Loughborough College in 2013 and attended Oldham Hulme Grammar School through primary and secondary education

References

External links 
 

1988 births
Living people
English female field hockey players
Field hockey players at the 2012 Summer Olympics
Olympic field hockey players of Great Britain
Olympic medalists in field hockey
Olympic bronze medallists for Great Britain
People from Oldham
People from Shaw and Crompton
Medalists at the 2012 Summer Olympics
Field hockey players at the 2014 Commonwealth Games
Commonwealth Games silver medallists for England
Commonwealth Games bronze medallists for England
Field hockey players at the 2016 Summer Olympics
Field hockey players at the 2010 Commonwealth Games
Medalists at the 2016 Summer Olympics
Olympic gold medallists for Great Britain
Commonwealth Games medallists in field hockey
Members of the Order of the British Empire
Loughborough Students field hockey players
Holcombe Hockey Club players
Women's England Hockey League players
Medallists at the 2010 Commonwealth Games
Medallists at the 2014 Commonwealth Games